The 2018 Grand Est Open 88 was a professional tennis tournament played on outdoor clay courts. It was the twelfth edition of the tournament and was part of the 2018 ITF Women's Circuit. It took place in Contrexéville, France, on 9–15 July 2018.

Singles main draw entrants

Seeds 

 1 Rankings as of 2 July 2018.

Other entrants 
The following players received a wildcard into the singles main draw:
  Tessah Andrianjafitrimo
  Sara Cakarevic
  Amandine Hesse
  Claire Liu

The following players received entry from the qualifying draw:
  Mandy Minella
  Mallaurie Noël
  Anastasiya Vasylyeva
  Lucie Wargnier

Champions

Singles

 Stefanie Vögele def.  Sara Sorribes Tormo, 6–4, 6–2

Doubles

 An-Sophie Mestach /  Zheng Saisai def.  Prarthana Thombare /  Eva Wacanno, 3–6, 6–2, [10–7]

External links 
 2018 Grand Est Open 88 at ITFtennis.com
 Official website

2018 ITF Women's Circuit
2018 in French tennis
Grand Est Open 88